Hillmer is a surname. Notable people with the surname include: 

George Hillmer (1866–1935), Canadian merchant and politician
Jack Hillmer (1918–2007), American architect
Norman Hillmer (born 1942), Canadian historian and teacher

See also
Hiller (surname)
Hilmer